Salih Bozok (1881 – April 25, 1941) was an officer of the Ottoman Army, later the Turkish Army and a politician of the Republic of Turkey. He was the chief aide-de-camp of Mustafa Kemal (Atatürk), the founder of modern Turkey.

Bozok was a close childhood and lifelong friend of Atatürk, both having been born in 1881 in Salonica and having attended the Monastir Military High School together. On November 10, 1938, upon witnessing the dead body of Atatürk in the latter's bedroom of Dolmabahçe Palace, a distraught and stunned Bozok stepped outside and shot himself through the chest with a pistol. However, the bullet narrowly missed his heart, and Bozok did not succumb to his fatal wound until April 1941.

Bozok's life and friendship with Atatürk was depicted in the successful 2010 Turkish film Veda.

Works
 (Salih Bozok - Cemil S.Bozok), Hep Atatürk'ün Yanında", ATATÜRK VAKFI YAYINLARI, Istanbul 2019,
 (Can Dündar), Yaveri Atatürk'ü Anlatıyor, Doğan Kitapçılık, Istanbul, 2001.
 (Cemil S. Bozok), Hep Atatürk'ün Yanında, Çağdaş Yayınları, Istanbul, 1985.

Medals and decorations
Medal of Independence with Red Ribbon

See also
Veda (film)

References

Sources
{https://yenisayfaonline.com/2018/05/11/nesilden-nesile-salih-bozok/}

External links

1881 births
1941 deaths
Military personnel from Thessaloniki
People from Salonica vilayet
Macedonian Turks
Republican People's Party (Turkey) politicians
Deputies of Yozgat
Deputies of Bilecik
Ottoman Army officers
Turkish Army officers
Ottoman military personnel of the Balkan Wars
Ottoman military personnel of World War I
Turkish military personnel of the Turkish War of Independence
Monastir Military High School alumni
Ottoman Military Academy alumni
Recipients of the Medal of Independence with Red Ribbon (Turkey)